Xtreme Concepts Inc. Racing, also known as XCI Racing, was an American professional stock car racing team owned by Landon Ash and was a subsidiary of Xtreme Concepts Inc. The team last competed part-time in 2019 in the NASCAR Cup Series, fielding the No. 81 Toyota Camry for Jeffrey Earnhardt and part-time in the NASCAR Xfinity Series, fielding the No. 81 Toyota Supra for Earnhardt and Erik Jones as well. XCI Racing had a technical alliance with Joe Gibbs Racing.

NASCAR Cup Series
The team scheduled to attempt both Talladega races in 2019 with Earnhardt in the No. 81 Camry. Team executive Landon Ash has stated that the goal of XCI Racing is to run a full schedule in the Monster Energy NASCAR Cup Series. On August 7, 2019, Earnhardt announced that he parted ways with sponsor and XCI affiliate iK9, as well as Joe Gibbs Racing.

NASCAR Cup Series results

NASCAR Xfinity Series
The team attempted five races with Earnhardt in the No. 81 Supra, beginning at Texas in March. Additional races include Chicagoland Speedway in June, Daytona International Speedway in July and Bristol Motor Speedway and Darlington Raceway in August. On July 3, 2019, XCI Racing unexpectedly withdrew from the July Daytona race. On August 7, 2019, Earnhardt announced that he parted ways with sponsor and XCI affiliate iK9, as well as Joe Gibbs Racing. JGR driver Erik Jones took over the No. 81 car at the Bristol night race, where he finished 37th after being involved in a multi-car pileup with Christopher Bell, Cole Custer, and Joey Logano.

NASCAR Xfinity Series results

References

American auto racing teams
Defunct NASCAR teams
Auto racing teams established in 2019
Auto racing teams disestablished in 2019